Max Frauendorfer  (June 14, 1909 – July 25, 1989) was a German jurist and politician, representative of the NSDAP and the Christian Social Union of Bavaria.

Literature 
 Thomas Schlemmer: Grenzen der Integration. Die CSU und der Umgang mit der nationalsozialistischen Vergangenheit – Der Fall Dr. Max Frauendorfer. In: Institut für Zeitgeschichte München (Hrsg.): Vierteljahrshefte für Zeitgeschichte, 48. Jahrgang, Heft 4 / 2000, ISSN 0042-5702.
 Erich Stockhorst: 5000 Köpfe - Wer war was im Dritten Reich. Arndt, Kiel 2000, .
 Ernst Klee: Das Personenlexikon zum Dritten Reich. Fischer Verlag, Frankfurt am Main 2007, . (Aktualisierte 2. Auflage)
 Reinhard Bollmus: Das Amt Rosenberg und seine Gegner. Studien zum Machtkampf im nationalsozialistischen Herrschaftssystem. Stuttgart 1970. (2. Auflage, Oldenbourg, München 2006, .)

See also 
 List of Bavarian Christian Social Union politicians

References

Christian Social Union in Bavaria politicians
1909 births
1989 deaths
Nazi Party members
SS-Obersturmbannführer